Ukrenergo (literally 'National Power Company "Ukrenergo"') is an electricity transmission system operator in Ukraine and the sole operator of the country's high-voltage transmission lines. It is 100% owned by Ukrainian government (Ministry of Energy).

The territory of the Soviet Union was integrated into the IPS/UPS synchronous grid, which is now effectively controlled by Russia. The one exception was the "Burshtyn Power Island", centered on the Burshtyn TES, which in 2003 was connected to the synchronous grid of Continental Europe, controlled by the European Network of Transmission System Operators for Electricity (ENTSO-E).

Ukraine continued this arrangement until the annexation of Crimea by the Russian Federation in 2014, after which Ukraine signed an association agreement with EU. On 28 June 2017, an agreement was signed to synchronize the whole Ukrainian power grid with the European grid. The agreement outlined a roadmap to finalize the process in 2023. But the military buildup preceding the 2022 Russian invasion of Ukraine accelerated this process.  On 24 February 2022, 4 hours before the invasion, Ukraine was disconnected from the Russian grid  in what was expected to be a 72 hours test of autonomous stability.
Ukraine was able to continue in this less-stable configuration because electricity demand was reduced by about a third as civilians fled the country and fighting caused blackouts in some areas.

Ukraine and Moldova were connected with the ENTSO-E grid on 16 March 2022.

Ukraine cannot sell power into the rest of the ENTSO-E grid until it installs static synchronous compensators. It is allowed to import electricity, but there is limited transmission capacity to do so, far less than would be needed to power the entire country.

References

Electric power companies of Ukraine
Electric power transmission system operators in Ukraine
Energy in Ukraine
Ukrainian companies established in 1998
Energy companies established in 1998
Government-owned companies of Ukraine
Companies based in Kyiv